Pickhill is a village in North Yorkshire, England,  west of Thirsk. It forms part of Hambleton District, and is a part of the civil parish of Pickhill with Roxby.

History

The Roman road, Dere Street, passed close to the village following the route of the modern A1(M) motorway.

The village is mentioned in the Domesday Book as Picala. The manor at the time of the Norman invasion was split between Sprot and Thor. Afterwards it passed to Count Alan of Brittany. Up to the 16th century, the manor was largely owned by the Neville family, with some having been given to Fountains Abbey. Thereafter it was split in two and was the possession of the Byerley and Meynell families until the 18th century.

Pickhill with Roxby was a large ancient parish, which comprised the townships of Ainderby Quernhow, Holme, Howe, Pickhill with Roxby, Sinderby and Swainby with Allerthorpe.  All these townships became separate civil parishes in 1866.

The village used to have a station in the North Eastern Railway region on the Ripon to Northallerton Line. The old Station House can be found on Cross Lane. It was functioning between March 1875 and September 1959.

Roxby 
By the 20th century it was reduced to a single farmhouse, Roxby House. The farmhouse was demolished in 1994 to make way for the construction of the A1(M) motorway.

Governance

The village lies within the Richmond (Yorks) UK Parliament constituency. It is also within the Bedale electoral division of North Yorkshire County Council and the Tanfield ward of Hambleton District Council.

Geography

The village is located a mile east of the A1(M), and its nearest neighbours are Sinderby  to the south, Holme  to the south-east and Ainderby Quernhow  to the south. Pickhill Beck runs through the village before joining the nearby River Swale

The 2001 UK Census recorded the population as 411, of which 318 were over the age of sixteen years. There were 157 dwellings of which 112 were detached.

Education

The village has one school, Pickhill CE Primary School, which is within the catchment area of Thirsk School for secondary education.

Religion

There is a church in the village dedicated to All Saints. Built around the 12th century, it is a Grade II* listed building that has been restored several times. There was a Wesleyan Chapel erected in the village around 1864, now disused.

References

External links

Villages in North Yorkshire
Hambleton District